The 1939 Wimbledon Championships took place on the outdoor grass courts at the All England Lawn Tennis and Croquet Club in Wimbledon, London, United Kingdom. The tournament was held from Monday 26 June until Saturday 8 July 1939. It was the 59th staging of the Wimbledon Championships, and the third Grand Slam tennis event of 1939. Bobby Riggs and Alice Marble won the singles titles. This was the last edition of the Wimbledon Championships before the outbreak of World War II. The event would not be held again until 1946.

Finals

Men's singles

 Bobby Riggs defeated  Elwood Cooke, 2–6, 8–6, 3–6, 6–3, 6–2

Women's singles

 Alice Marble defeated  Kay Stammers, 6–2, 6–0

Men's doubles

 Elwood Cooke /  Bobby Riggs defeated  Charles Hare /  Frank Wilde, 6–3, 3–6, 6–3, 9–7

Women's doubles

 Sarah Fabyan /  Alice Marble defeated  Helen Jacobs /  Billie Yorke, 6–1, 6–0

Mixed doubles

 Bobby Riggs /  Alice Marble defeated  Frank Wilde /  Nina Brown, 9–7, 6–1

References

External links
 Official Wimbledon Championships website

 
Wimbledon Championships
Wimbledon Championships
Wimbledon Championships
Wimbledon Championships